The Pacific thread herring or deep-bodied Pacific thread herring (Opisthonema libertate) is a herring-like fish in the family Clupeidae. It is found in the Eastern Pacific. It can grow to  total length.

References

Pacific thread herring
Fish of the Pacific Ocean
Western Central American coastal fauna
Pacific thread herring
Pacific thread herring